Big Ones of Alternative Rock vol. 1 was a compilation released in 1996.

Track listing 
 White Zombie - "Thunder Kiss '65" (Robert Cummings/Ivan DePrume/Shauna Reynolds/Jay Noel Yuenger) - 3:55
 Bush - "Everything Zen" (Gavin Rossdale) - 4:38
 The Cranberries - "Dreams" (Noel Hogan/Dolores O'Riordan) - 4:29
 Juliana Hatfield - "Universal Heart-Beat" (Juliana Hatfield) - 3:25
 CIV - "Can't Wait One Minute More" (Walter Schreifels) - 2:32
 Whale - "Hobo Humpin' Slobo Babe" (Whale) - 3:59
 Divinyls - "I Touch Myself" (Christina Amphlett/Tom Kelly/Mark McEntee/William Steinberg) - 3:44
 G. Love & Special Sauce - "Cold Beverage" (G. Love) - 2:33
 Korn - "Blind" (Reginald "Fieldy" Arvizu/Jonathan Davis/Don Schinn/James "Munky" Shaffer/Ryan Shuck/David Silveria/Brian Welch) - 4:08
 Deadeye Dick - "New Age Girl" (Caleb Guillotte) - 3:28
 Meat Puppets - "Backwater" (Curt Kirkwood) - 3:40
 Danzig - "Until You Call on the Dark" (Glenn Danzig) - 4:27

1996 compilation albums
Alternative rock compilation albums
Hard rock compilation albums